Le Coteau is a commune in the Loire department in central France.

Population

Twin towns
Le Coteau is twinned with:

  Zwevegem, Belgium, since 1966
  Lorsch, Germany, since 1967
  Espalion, France, since 1998
  Marchamalo, Spain, since 2007

See also
Communes of the Loire department

References

Communes of Loire (department)